The 2014 Waltham Forest Council election took place on 22 May 2014 to elect members of Waltham Forest Council in England. This was on the same day as other local elections.

Eligibility 

All locally registered electors (British, Irish, Commonwealth and European Union citizens) who were aged 18 or over on Thursday 22 May 2014 were entitled to vote in the local elections. Those who were temporarily away from their ordinary address (for example, away working, on holiday, in student accommodation or in hospital) were also entitled to vote in the local elections, although those who had moved abroad and registered as overseas electors cannot vote in the local elections. It is possible to register to vote at more than one address (such as a university student who had a term-time address and lives at home during holidays) at the discretion of the local Electoral Register Office, but it remains an offence to vote more than once in the same local government election.

Composition before election

Election result

Results by ward

The ward results listed below are based on the changes from the 2010 elections, not taking into account any mid-term by-elections or party defections.

References

Waltham Forest
2014